The  is a railway museum in Sumida, Tokyo, Japan. It opened in May 1989, and is operated by Tobu Railway.

The museum was closed from January 2009 until June 2009 for refurbishment. It reopened on 22 July 2009.

Exhibits
The following full-size vehicles are on display.

B1 class steam locomotive – No. 5 (built 1898 by Beyer, Peacock & Company)
B1 class steam locomotive – No. 6 (built 1898 by Beyer, Peacock & Company)
ED101 class electric locomotive – No. 101 (later ED4000 class No. ED4001, built 1930, moved to museum from Ohmi Railway in January 2009)
ED5010 class electric locomotive - No. ED5015 (built 1959)
Class DeHa1 electric railcar – No. DeHa5 (built 1924)
1720 series "DRC" electric multiple unit car – cab section only (built 1960)
5700 series electric multiple unit car – No. MoHa5701 (built 1951, moved to museum in January 2009)
Nikkō Tramway 200 series tramcar - No. 203 (built 1954)

The collection includes a reproduction of a station office Including automatic ticket gates outside with see-through covering, ticket vending machines, interlocking board, telephone and railroad exhibits. A season ticket issuing machine and "celebrate admission pass" is issued free of charge.

The museum also owns the 6-car Tobu 8000 series EMU set 8111, which was repainted into its original "royal beige" and "international orange" livery for a series of special event runs on Tobu Lines.

Access
The museum is located underneath Higashi-Mukōjima Station on the Tobu Skytree Line. Visitors can view trains passing at close range from windows underneath the platform.

Address
4-28-16 Higashi-mukōjima, Sumida-ku, Tokyo

References

External links

Official website 

Museums established in 1989
Museums in Tokyo
Railway museums in Japan
Tobu Railway
1989 establishments in Japan
Buildings and structures in Sumida, Tokyo